Naadir Nigel Hamid Hassan (born March 1982) is a Seychellois politician and banker. He serves as the Minister of Finance, Economic Planning and Trade since 3 November 2020, succeeding Maurice Loustau-Lalanne.

Biography
Naadir Hassan hails from Anse Royale in the Seychelles. He holds a master's degree in Banking and Finance. In 2005, he started at the Ministry of Finance as a policy analyst. Later he served as Head of Financial Surveillance at the Central Bank of Seychelles. In August 2020, he started to work for Cable and Wireless.

On 29 October 2020, he was elected Minister of Finance, Economic Planning and Trade.

References

Living people
Finance Ministers of Seychelles
Trade ministers of Seychelles
Government ministers of Seychelles
Seychellois economists
People from Anse Royale
1982 births